Daniel Anthony Mitrione (August 4, 1920 – August 10, 1970) was a U.S. government official in Latin America who trained local police in the use of torture. He was kidnapped and murdered by the Tupamaros guerrilla group fighting against the authoritarian government in Montevideo, Uruguay.

Early life and career 
Dan Mitrione was born in Italy, the second son of Joseph and Maria Mitrione. The family emigrated to America soon after Dan's birth, settling in Richmond, Indiana, where Mitrione grew up. Mitrione married Henrietta Lind while serving on a Michigan naval base during World War II, and the couple eventually had nine children. After the war ended, Mitrione became a police officer in Richmond. He started as a patrolman in 1945, rising through the ranks until he was hired as the Richmond chief of police in 1956, a position which he held until 1960.

Career in the Office of Public Safety 
In 1960, Mitrione joined the Public Safety program of the International Cooperation Administration (ICA). The program, begun in 1954, provided U.S. aid and training to civilian police in countries around the world. Mitrione's first post was in Belo Horizonte, a large city about 250 miles northwest of Rio de Janeiro. During the two years Mitrione was posted in Belo Horizonte, ICA was replaced by the United States Agency for International Development, and the police aid program was reorganized into the Office of Public Safety (OPS).

After two years in Belo Horizonte,  Mitrione was transferred to Rio de Janeiro in 1962, where he served as a training adviser for another five years. During these five years he shared torture techniques that were used by the Brazilian dictatorship against its own citizens. In 1967, he was rotated back to the United States and taught for two years at the OPS International Police Academy in Washington, D.C.

Uruguay 

In 1969, Mitrione was appointed the OPS Chief Public Safety Adviser in Montevideo, Uruguay. In this period the Uruguayan government, led by the Colorado Party, had its hands full with a collapsing economy, labor and student strikes, and the Tupamaros, a left-wing urban guerrilla group. On the other hand, Washington feared a possible victory during the elections of the Frente Amplio, a left-wing coalition, on the model of the also-Cuban-supported victory of the Unidad Popular government in Chile, led by Salvador Allende, in 1970. The OPS had been helping the local police since 1965, providing them with weapons and training.

Former Uruguayan police officials and CIA operatives stated Mitrione had taught torture techniques to Uruguayan police in the cellar of his Montevideo home, including the use of electrical shocks delivered to his victims' mouths and genitals. His credo was "The precise pain, in the precise place, in the precise amount, for the desired effect." He also helped train foreign police agents in the United States in the context of the Cold War. In 1978, at the 11th International Youth Festival in Cuba, Manuel Hevia Cosculluela, a Cuban who claimed to have infiltrated the CIA as double agent from 1962 to 1970, stated that Mitrione ordered the abduction of homeless people, so that he could use them as 'guinea pigs' in his torture classes. He said that attempts would be made to keep each victim alive for multiple torture sessions, but that torture would eventually kill them, and that their mutilated bodies would be dumped in the streets. He claimed that Mitrione personally tortured four homeless people to death.

Mitrione's captors may also have believed him to be the inventor of a torture device known as the "Mitrioni vest". This alleged device was described as "an inflatable vest which can be used to increase pressure on the chest during interrogation, sometimes crushing the rib cage."

Mitrione was kidnapped by the Tupamaros on July 31, 1970 demanding the release of 150 political prisoners. The Uruguayan government, with U.S. backing, refused and Mitrione was later found dead in a car, shot twice in the head. There were no other visible signs of maltreatment, beyond the fact that during the kidnapping, Mitrione had been shot in one shoulder, a wound that was clean and healing well, and had evidently been treated while in captivity.

Tom Golden, a career army intelligence operative detailed to the CIA and assigned to the U.S. Embassy in Montevideo, was a personal friend of Mitrione. Golden worked closely with Uruguayan officials to try and secure the release of Mitrione and prevent his murder. After Mitrione's death, Golden disputed the torture-training allegations in closed-door testimony to the Senate Intelligence Committee.

In his autobiography (Ambassador Ortiz: Lessons from a Life of Service, Albuquerque, University of New Mexico Press, 2005, p. 106),  Frank V. Ortiz whose appointment as Deputy Chief of Mission at the United States Embassy in Montevideo coincided with the kidnapping and killing of Mitrione, wrote: "My first duty, on my first day in Montevideo, was to attend a memorial service for Dan Mitrioni, a former state chief of police from New Mexico who headed a U.S. mission to train the Uruguayan police to combat terrorism. Just four days before we [Ortiz and his family] arrived, the Tupamaros had kidnapped Mitrioni during a carefully organized operation against American Embassy officials. They also captured the head of the commercial section of the embassy by hitting him on the head, wrapping him in a rug, and tying him down in the back of a pickup. Fortunately, he worked his ties loose and jumped out of the pickup while it was speeding down the road. The terrorists also tried to take the cultural attaché. They jumped him in the garage of his apartment building, but he honked his car horn, attracting attention and scaring off his would-be captors. But poor Mitrioni--they tied him up, tortured him, and finally killed him."

In 1987, two years after being released from prison, the leader of the Tupamaros, Raúl Sendic, said in an interview that Mitrione had been selected for kidnapping because he had trained police in riot control, and as retaliation for the deaths of student protestors. He did not mention the accusations of torture. In addition, Sendic also revealed that Mitrione's death was unintended; the Tupamaro leaders had decided to keep Mitrione alive and hold him indefinitely instead of killing him if the government continued to refuse their demands.

On August 7, 1970, just a week after the kidnapping, the Uruguayan police raided the house where the Tupamaro leadership was staying and captured Sendic and the others. A short time later, he said, the replacement leadership, which also knew of the plan to keep Mitrione alive, was also captured. "Those captured lost all contact with the others," he said, "and when the deadline came the group that was left with Mitrione did not know what to do. So they decided to carry out the threat."

Continuing controversy and diplomatic exchanges
The Mitrione case continued to reverberate within U.S.-Uruguayan relations in 2008, with U.S. Ambassador to Uruguay Frank E. Baxter being involved in high level exchanges about Uruguayan investigations into other crimes committed during the country's civilian-military dictatorship from 1973 until 1985, to which linkages were allegedly perceived.

Commemoration 
The Nixon Administration, through spokesman Ron Ziegler, affirmed that Mitrione's "devoted service to the cause of peaceful progress in an orderly world will remain as an example for free men everywhere." His funeral was widely publicised by the U.S. media and was attended by, amongst others, David Eisenhower and Richard Nixon's secretary of state William Rogers.

Frank Sinatra and Jerry Lewis held a benefit concert for his family in Richmond, Indiana.

In fiction 
The 1972 movie State of Siege by Costa-Gavras is based on the story of Mitrione's kidnapping.

The kidnapping and the execution of Mitrione are also central to the plot of the novel El color que el infierno me escondiera by Uruguayan author .

The French espionage fiction novel SAS 31: L'ange de Montevideo, written in 1973 by Gérard de Villiers, relates the CIA agent kidnapping, torture and killing by the Tupamaros. The agent's name is Ron Barber, but as is often the case in SAS novels, the stories are based on real world events and being as the fictional character Ron Barber was a torture instructor in Uruguay; it is possible that Barber is based on Dan Mitrione.

See also 
History of Uruguay
History of Brazil (1964-1985)

References

Sources

Further reading

External links 
Torture's Teachers

1920 births
1970 deaths
American expatriates in Uruguay
American municipal police officers
American people murdered abroad
Assassinated American diplomats
Deaths by firearm in Uruguay
Italian emigrants to the United States
Military personnel from Indiana
People from Richmond, Indiana
People murdered in Uruguay
Terrorism in Uruguay
Torture in Uruguay
1970 murders in Uruguay
American terrorism victims
United States Navy personnel of World War II
American expatriates in Brazil